EB v Order of the Oblates of Mary Immaculate in the Province of British Columbia, [2005] 3 SCR 45; 2005 SCC 60 is a leading case decided by the Supreme Court of Canada on vicarious liability in employment law and on the application of Bazley v Curry. The Court held that a residential school could not be held liable for the sexual assaults committed by a support staff member because there was not enough connection between the employee's position and the risk of harm.

External links
 

Supreme Court of Canada cases
Child abuse case law
2005 in Canadian case law
Catholic Church sexual abuse scandals in Canada